"Despre tine" is the second single release from O-Zone's second album Number 1, and came back in their last album, DiscO-Zone. Following up their 2003 summer hit "Dragostea Din Tei", "Despre tine" proved to be a smaller hit than its predecessor, but a big enough one to make number one in several European countries.

Song information

The single was not released in the United Kingdom and did not benefit from large-scale promotion like "Dragostea Din Tei". "Despre tine" reached number four on the Eurochart Hot 100. On DiscO-Zone, the track features a similar sound to O-Zone's previous hit, originally circulating on the Internet as an allegedly 'original version' of the "Dragostea din tei" song, due to the similar chorus. At the start of the predecessor's music video, the music playing before the band members get onto the airplane is "Despre tine [unu' in the mix]".

Track listings
CD single (2004 re-release)
 "Despre tine" — 3:49
 "Despre tine" (Italian version) — 3:33

CD maxi (2004 re-release)
 "Despre tine" (original album version) — 3:47
 "Dragostea din tei" (original Romanian version) — 3:33
 "Despre tine" (Prezioso & Marvin radio edit) — 3:32
 "Despre tine" (beach extended version) — 5:28
 "Despre tine" (video) — 3:53

Charts

Weekly charts

Year-end charts

Certifications and sales

See also
 List of Romanian Top 100 number ones of the 2000s

References

2001 songs
2002 singles
2004 singles
Number-one singles in Norway
Number-one singles in Romania
O-Zone songs
Romanian songs
Songs written by Dan Balan
Universal Music Group singles